Daniele Iacoponi (born 25 March 2002) is an Italian professional footballer who plays as a winger for  club Foggia on loan from Parma.

Club career
On 13 January 2022, he joined Pordenone on loan until the end of the season. On 31 August 2022, Iacoponi was loaned by Foggia.

References

External links

2002 births
Living people
Footballers from Rome
Italian footballers
Association football midfielders
Serie B players
Serie C players
Serie D players
S.S. Arezzo players
Parma Calcio 1913 players
Pordenone Calcio players
Calcio Foggia 1920 players